Jiao Zhe is a Chinese football player who currently plays for Beijing Renhe as a right-back.

Club career
Jiao Zhe started his professional football career in 1999 for top tier side Shandong Luneng after he graduated from their youth team. In the 2001 league season he continued to progress in establishing himself for the Shandong Luneng team where he was firmly established as their first choice right-back by playing in 17 league games, which was followed by a further 28 league games in the 2002 league season. In the 2004 league season Jiao Zhe would continue to play a major part in the Shandong Luneng team and under new manager Ljubiša Tumbaković Jiao would even score his first league goal on 15 September 2004 when he scored the equalising goal against Beijing Guoan in a 1–1 draw. By the end of the league season Jiao Zhe would win his first piece of silverware when he help win the 2004 Chinese FA Cup with Shandong Luneng.

International career
On 19 June 2005, Jiao Zhe would make his international debut against Costa Rica in a 2–2 draw coming on as a subsistute for Wei Xin in a friendly match. After making several further friendly appearances Jiao Zhe would play in his first competitive game against Vietnam in an Asian Cup Qualifier on 21 January 2009 in a 6–1 win.

Career statistics
.

Honours
Shandong Luneng
Chinese Super League: 2006, 2008, 2010
Chinese FA Cup: 2004, 2006
Chinese Super League Cup: 2004

References

External links
Shandong Luneng Club profile
Player stats at Football-lineups.com

Player stats at Sohu.com

1981 births
Living people
Sportspeople from Jinan
Chinese footballers
Footballers from Shandong
China international footballers
Shandong Taishan F.C. players
Zhejiang Professional F.C. players
Beijing Guoan F.C. players
Qingdao Hainiu F.C. (1990) players
Inner Mongolia Zhongyou F.C. players
Cangzhou Mighty Lions F.C. players
Beijing Renhe F.C. players
Chinese Super League players
China League One players
China League Two players
Association football defenders